The Outback Rugby League Cup is a New South Wales Country Rugby League (NSWCRL) Group Competition which is based in Broken Hill in the far west of New South Wales and surrounding districts such as Wilcannia and Menindee.

The competition folded in 1998 but was revived in 2007.

Teams (On loan, playing in Sunraysia-Riverlands League)

Former Clubs:
 Broken Hill Cowboys
 Broken Hill Geebungs
 Broken Hill Saints
  Wilcannia Boomerangs
 Wilcannia Tigers
  Menindee Yabbies

The founding clubs of the competition were:

 Broken Hill Cowboys
  Wilcannia Boomerangs
 Wilcannia Tigers
 Menindee Yabbies

History

The Outback Rugby League was formed in 2007 after a long absence of regular A-Grade rugby league from Broken Hill. The last regular rugby league competition in the area was in 1997 as the Group 12 competition which also included clubs from Broken Hill, Menindee & Wilcannia.

The new competition features clubs from the same areas. A new club was formed before the opening season, the Wilcannia Tigers. The inaugural competition saw a total of 266 registered players across all grades, from under-sixes up. Broken Hill is traditionally dominated by Australian Rules Football.

The 2007 Grand final was a close game between Wilcannia Tigers and Menindee Yabbies. The Yabbies eventually won by one point, 36–35, at Lamb Park in Broken Hill in front of 1,000 spectators. Recently, for the 2008 Outback Rugby League Season, CFMEU (the major sponsor of such teams as the Canberra Raiders) has signed on to become the competition's major sponsor from 2008 and beyond. This will be a massive boost for the competition, financially speaking.

First grade premiership
The premiers of the group competition since 1980:

See also

Rugby League Competitions in Australia

References

External links

Rugby league competitions in New South Wales
Recurring sporting events established in 1980
1980 establishments in Australia
Sports leagues established in 1980